is a Japanese tarento and gravure idol. She graduated from the Tokyo University of Agriculture where she was a member of the Interact Club. She used to be a Gabu Girl and a member of the Miniskirt Police. Her hobbies include cooking, bowling, and piano.

Appearances

Television
Altemish Night
Shutsudō! Miniskirt Police
Tonight 2
Tokyo Morning Supplement

Advertisement
The Dai-ichi Mutual Life Insurance Company (1999)

Film
Mr. Rookie (2002)

Works

Photobooks
Natsu Gaburi!! (September 1999)
F no Kanjō. (October 1999)

References

People from Tokyo
1981 births
Living people
Japanese gravure idols
Japanese television personalities